Paul Thomas Field is a 1,200-seat baseball stadium in Wenatchee, Washington.  It is located on the campus of Wenatchee Valley College; the college's baseball team shares the stadium with the Wenatchee AppleSox of the West Coast League.

540 of the stadium's seats were previously used at the Kingdome in Seattle.

External links
Wenatchee AppleSox
West Coast Collegiate Baseball League

College baseball venues in the United States
Sports venues in Washington (state)
Buildings and structures in Chelan County, Washington